Anolis leditzigorum is a species of lizard in the family Dactyloidae. The species is found in Costa Rica.

References

Anoles
Endemic fauna of Costa Rica
Reptiles of Costa Rica
Reptiles described in 2014
Taxa named by Gunther Köhler